Carol Ode is an American politician who has served in the Vermont House of Representatives since 2017.

References

Living people
University of Vermont alumni
Cornell Law School alumni
21st-century American politicians
21st-century American women politicians
Democratic Party members of the Vermont House of Representatives
Women state legislators in Vermont
Year of birth missing (living people)